The I'll Be There Tour was the fourth headlining concert tour by American rap collective Brockhampton, in support of their fourth studio album, Iridescence. The tour began on September 21, 2018, in Auckland, and concluded on December 6, 2018, in Las Vegas.

Background and development
In June 2018, Brockhampton announced Australia and New Zealand tour dates in support of their fourth album, Iridescence. On August 30, 2018, they announced North American tour dates.

Setlist 
This setlist is representative of the show on September 25, 2018, in Melbourne. It does not represent all the shows from the tour.

"Weight"
"New Orleans"
"Zipper"
"Queer"
"Gummy"
"Blind"
"Star"
"Tonya"
"Gold"
"Where The Cash At"
"Sweet"
"Berlin"
"Honey"
"Bleach"
"J'Ouvert"
"District"
"San Marcos"
"Fabric"
Encore
 "1998 Truman"
 "1999 Wildfire"
 "Boogie"

Tour dates

References

2018 concert tours